Nanchang University Jiangxi Medical College  (JMC), also known as the Faculty of Medicine, Nanchang University, is the medical school of Nanchang University in Nanchang, Jiangxi province. It is a National Key University under the administration of the Jiangxi Provincial Government.

History 
Founded in 1921, the Faculty of Medicine of Nanchang University was originally named Jiangxi Public Medical School, which was the earliest medical school in Jiangxi Province. In 1958, the school was merged with the 8th Military Medical School of the Chinese People’s Liberation Army, and changed its name to Jiangxi Medical College. In 2005, a merger was implemented between Jiangxi Medical College and Nanchang University. Since then, the combined body has used the new name, Faculty of Medicine of Nanchang University. In its long history of development, the college has evolved a philosophy of "High Morals with Outstanding Expertise" and spirit of "strictness, diligence, solidarity, and innovation" along with profound cultural deposits.

References

External links
Nanchang University  Faculty of Medicine official website

Medical schools in China
Nanchang University